Irungbam Khelemba Singh (born 1985) is a retired Indian professional footballer who played as a defender.

Career

Early career
Khelemba Singh hails from Imphal. He had started playing football since his schooldays. His talent didn't go unnoticed and he soon played in the Manipur League for SSC Sekta & Sagaoband United. In 2004, he joined Guwahati's Green Valley F.C. and then played in the I-League 2nd division for Assam State Electricity Board (ASEB), the same year. After joining Churchill Brothers in 2005, Khelemba played for four other I-League clubs Viva Kerala, East Bengal, Air India & Salgaocar before joining McDowell Mohun Bagan.

Viva Kerala
In the I-League match at Calicut against Air India, when Sulley Mussah had fouled Badmus Babatunde, Viva Kerala captain Khelemba Singh scored from a 40-yard long stunning free kick, a thriller which finally ended in a 3–2 win for the home team.

Mumbai
On 24 November 2013 it was announced that Khelemba has signed for Mumbai on loan from IMG Realiance with three other players Mohammed Rafi, N.P. Pradeep and Peter Costa.
He made his debut on 2 December 2013 against East Bengal F.C. at the Balewadi Sports Complex in which he played the whole match as Mumbai won the match 3–2.

References

External links
 http://www.indianfootball.com/en/statistic/player/detail/playerId/92
 http://goal.com/en-india/people/india/25397/khelemba-singh

Indian footballers
1985 births
Living people
People from Imphal
Footballers from Manipur
Churchill Brothers FC Goa players
East Bengal Club players
I-League players
Air India FC players
Salgaocar FC players
Mohun Bagan AC players
Mumbai FC players
Shillong Lajong FC players
Indian Super League players
Chennaiyin FC players
Association football defenders
Calcutta Football League players